Bank Massad is an Israeli bank.

History
Bank Massad was founded in 1929 as the Massad Mutual Loans and Savings Company by Histadrut HaMorim (Israel's teachers' trade union). Today it is a subsidiary of First International Bank (51%), jointly owned with Histadrut HaMorim.

See also
Economy of Israel
Banking in Israel

References

Massad